The 2019 Ladies European Tour was a series of golf tournaments for elite female golfers from around the world, played from 10 January to 8 December 2019. The tournaments were sanctioned by the Ladies European Tour (LET).

Schedule
The table below shows the 2019 schedule. The numbers in brackets after the winners' names indicate the career wins on the Ladies European Tour, including that event, and is only shown for members of the tour.

Key

Order of Merit rankings

Source:

See also
2019 LPGA Tour

References

External links
Official site of the Ladies European Tour
2019 Ladies European Tour Tournaments 

2019
2019 in women's golf
2019 in European sport